Homelix cruciata is a species of beetle in the family Cerambycidae. It was described by Stephan von Breuning in 1937, originally misspelled as "Homelix cruciatus". It is known from Uganda.

References

Endemic fauna of Uganda
Phrynetini
Beetles described in 1937